Pardes (English: Foreign Land ) is a Pakistani drama serial directed by Marina Khan and written by Sarwat Nazir. It stars Bushra Ansari, Sarmad Khoosat, Shaista Lodhi, Affan Waheed and Dur-e-Fishan Saleem in prominent roles. Produced by Humayun Saeed and Shehzad Naseeb under Six Sigma Plus, the serial airs double episodes weekly on ARY Digital. The story of the serial revolves around a man who goes to a foreign country to earn livelihood which affects his relationships and especially the lives of his children.

Plot 
Ahsan is the sole earner of the house while his younger brother Asim is jobeless and lazy in nature. Asim likes his cousin Nausheen and wants to marry her but it cannot happen because of his unemployment. One day, when Nausheen is home alone Asim goes to meet her and Nausheen's father catches them red-handed and fixes their marriage on the spot. Thus, Asim and Nausheen become husband and wife due to unforeseen circumstances. As the number of members in the family increases, Mumtaz pressurises Ahsan to go to work abroad. Unwillingly, Ahsan goes abroad and leaves his daughter Aimen and wife Zubeida in demise.

Cast

Main cast
 Dur-e-Fishan Saleem as Aimen, Zubeida and Ahsan's daughter
 Emaan Nayyab as  Aimen (young)
 Affan Waheed as Ibad, Aimen's class fellow
 Shaista Lodhi as Zubeida nicknamed Zubi, Ahsan's wife and Aimen's mother
 Sarmad Khoosat as Ahsan, Zubeida's husband and Aimen's father (Dead)

Supporting cast
 Bushra Ansari as Mumtaz, Ahsan and Asim's mother
 Gohar Rasheed as Asim, Ahsan's younger brother
 Shermeen Ali as Nausheen nicknamed Noshi, Asim's wife
 Atiqa Odho as Raheela, Ibad's mother
 Faiza Gillani as Nabeela, Ahsan's sister
 Hammad Shoaib as Salman, Nabeela's son
 Atabik Mohsin as Zaid, Aimen's brother
 Aliha Chaudry as Aliya, Ahsan's sister
 Jinaan Hussain as Sheema, Ibad's step-sister
 Yasir Ali Khan as Rohail, Ibad's step-brother
 Hina Javed as Rija, Rohail's wife
 Usman Mazhar as Manzoor, Nabeela's husband

Recurring cast
 Syed Mohammad Ahmed as Sadeeq, Nausheen's father
 Shazia Qaiser as Nausheen's mother and Mumtaz's sister

Reception

Television rating points (TRPs)

Accolades

References

External links
 Official website

ARY Digital original programming
2021 Pakistani television series debuts
Pakistani drama television series
Urdu-language television